For the use of hormone antagonists in cancer, see hormonal therapy (oncology)

A hormone antagonist is a specific type of receptor antagonist which acts upon hormone receptors. Such pharmaceutical drugs are used in antihormone therapy.

External links
 

Hormonal agents
Receptor antagonists